The Fort Wayne Railroad Historical Society (FWRHS) is a non-profit group in New Haven, Indiana that is dedicated to the restoration and operation of the ex-Nickel Plate Railroad's steam locomotive no. 765 and other vintage railroad equipment. Since restoration, the 765 was added to the National Register of Historic Places as no. 96001010 on September 12, 1996 and has operated excursion trains across the Eastern United States. In 2012, the FWRHS's steam locomotive no. 765 was added to the Norfolk Southern's 21st Century Steam program.

History 
The Fort Wayne Railroad Historical Society was formed in 1972 and currently has over 400 members and over 70 volunteers. The group was formed with one purpose in mind: to restore an old steam locomotive to operational use and see it running down the tracks again. The history of the group actually begins before the FWRHS was formally conceived.

The Fort Wayne Railroad Historical Society's story began with a series of events that began long before anyone had the idea to form a preservation group. In the mid-1950s, diesel locomotives began replacing steam locomotives for mainline freight and passenger service due to the cheaper operating costs of the diesels. With many of its steam locomotives retired or otherwise not in service by 1958, the New York, Chicago, & St. Louis Railroad, also known as the Nickel Plate Road, classified many of its steam locomotives in non-operating "stored-serviceable" condition. In 1958, the 765 was fired up as a stationary steam generating boiler in the Nickel Plate Road's New Haven, IN shops. Following a few short years in this role, the railroad officially retired the locomotive in 1963 and offered it to the city of Fort Wayne, IN as a static monument.

The city was eager to accept the railroad's offer, however, they wanted to receive locomotive 767 rather than the 765. They wanted the alternative locomotive because in October 1955 the city, in conjunction with the railroad, built an elevated railroad line through the city to eliminate railroad grade crossings that tied up traffic between the North and South ends of town, and the 767 was used to pull the ceremonial train across the newly constructed bridge. Due to a grade crossing accident and being stored outdoors afterwards, the 767 was much more deteriorated than the 765, which had been stored indoors. The city accepted the 765 and had its numbers repainted to 767. The steam engine was then pushed into Fort Wayne's Lawton Park, where it remained as a monument and a reminder of steam for the next 12 years.

In September 1971, at a convention for the Nickel Plate Railroad Historical & Technical Society, a group of individuals decided they wanted to discuss the possibility of restoring the 765, the 767, and a Wabash Railroad locomotive (no.534) cosmetically. By November of the next year, four individuals, Wayne York, Glenn Brendel, Walter Sassmannshausen, and John Eichman drafted incorporation paperwork with Allen County and the Fort Wayne Railroad Historical Society, INC. was born.

In 1973, the new group worked out a deal with the city of Fort Wayne to acquire the locomotive in Lawton Park under a 25-year lease. They then began looking at the locomotive on a more in-depth level and decided that the necessary repairs could not be done at the Lawton Park site. On September 6, 1974 the FWRHS built temporary tracks.  through the city to connect to the existing railroad tracks and they pulled the 765 from the park to the FWRHS property in New Haven. From 1975-1979, a group of unpaid volunteers completely rebuilt the 765 and in September 1979, the NKP 765 was fired and ran under its own steam for the first time for testing since 1963 Along with operating NKP 765, from 1994 to 2001, the facilities also housed another Berkshire locomotive, the Chesapeake and Ohio 2716 and operated it in 1996 on short excursions.

Locomotives 
 Nickel Plate Road 2-8-4 #765 (1974–present) (Currently operational based in New Haven, Indiana)
 Wabash 0-6-0 #534 (1984–present) (Currently undergoing restoration to operating condition based in New Haven, Indiana)
 Chicago, Burlington and Quincy 2-8-2 #4960 (Stored in Fort Wayne property 1985–1993) (Now owned by Grand Canyon Railway) (Currently operational based in Williams, Arizona)
Chesapeake and Ohio 2-8-4 #2700 (1991–2001) (Originally selected as a candidate for restoration, but ended up as a spare parts provider for #2716) (Currently on static display at the Dennison Railroad Depot Museum in Dennison, Ohio)
 Chesapeake and Ohio 2-8-4 #2716 (1994–2001) (Now leased by Kentucky Steam Heritage Corporation) (Currently undergoing restoration to operating condition based in Ravenna, Kentucky)
Nickel Plate Road 2-8-2 #624 (2007–present) (Currently pending for either cosmetic or operational restoration based in Hammond, Indiana)
 Nickel Plate Road SD9 #358 (2010–present) (Currently undergoing restoration to operating condition based in New Haven, Indiana)

About the 765 
Railroads commonly relied on drag freights with engines that could pull heavy tonnage, but at low speeds. Following experiments with existing designs, Lima Locomotive Works developed a new wheel arrangement, the 2-8-4, to accommodate an increase in the size of the locomotive's firebox. An increase in the firebox size allowed more coal combustion and subsequent heat output, improving the amount of steam developed and increasing horsepower. These and other modifications created the concept of "horsepower at speed."

The NKP 765 is a steam locomotive built for the Nickel Plate Road in 1944 by the Lima Locomotive Works. Classified as an "S-2" Berkshire-type steam locomotive, the locomotive is based on a 2-8-4 wheel arrangement. It operated freight and passenger trains until retirement in 1963. The Berkshire locomotives earned their name from the Berkshire Mountains in Southwest Massachusetts.

The Berkshire class of locomotives was not the heaviest, fastest, or most powerful, but was a popular all-around type intended for fast freight service. It survived in regular use until 1958, between Chicago, Fort Wayne, Cleveland, and Buffalo. The Nickel Plate was one of the last Class I railroads to regularly use steam locomotives, only the Illinois Central, Norfolk & Western, Colorado & Southern, Fort Worth & Denver, and Grand Trunk Western were to continue longer, until spring 1960.

The Nickel Plate Road had a fleet of 112 of the 2-8-4 Berkshire type steam locomotives. After retirement, most obsolete locomotives were cut up for scrap and melted down. A total of six were saved by various means. Five survivors were from the second batch of the S-2 Class, 755-769, which were built at the height of World War II in summer and fall 1944. The sixth survivor was from the S-3 Class, 770-779, built in spring 1949. The 779 was requested to be saved because it was the last steam locomotive of any type built by the Lima Locomotive Works, Lima, Ohio, the third largest commercial builder of steam locomotives in the United States.

The 765 was on display from 1963-1974 in Fort Wayne, Indiana's Lawton Park before being leased by the FWRHS. From 1975 to 1979, 765 was restored to operating condition at the corner of Ryan and Edgerton Roads in New Haven, IN. The restoration site lacked conventional shop facilities and protection from the elements, but on September 1, 1979 the 765 made its first move under its own power.

Later that winter it ran under its own power to Bellevue and Sandusky, Ohio for heated, indoor winter storage. In spring of 1980, 765 underwent a series of break-in runs followed by its first public excursion, making 765 the first mainline steam locomotive to be restored and operated by an all volunteer non-profit organization.

From 1993 to 2005, the 765 was completely rebuilt at a total cost of $750,000, which involved over 13,000 volunteer hours. The Society has an outstanding safety record and a professional, experienced crew of determined volunteers, several of whom have been with the Society since its inception. This rebuild included adding an MU stand and in-cab signalling  to allow the crew to know what the line-side signal aspect says before it comes into view.

On average, the locomotive experiences 3,000 visitors a day when operating, with visitor and passenger numbers running between 40,000 and 60,000 ticket buyers in 2009 and 2011 in less than 30 days, respectively. Typical passenger trains carry anywhere from 600-1,000 people at a time with tickets for many trips selling out in 24 hours.

Press reports indicate the continuous presence of large crowds of "locals and out of towners"  and on 765's ability to boost tourism in the towns that it travels through. In 2012, the Pittsburgh Tribune's headline photo proclaimed that the 765 was the "engine that still can" with CBS Pittsburgh describing it as "400 tons of Americana". When not operating excursions, 765 is maintained in a restoration shop in New Haven and maintained by a crew of 70-100 volunteers throughout the year. The shop is open to the public and houses a variety of other railroad equipment including vintage steam and diesel locomotives, passenger cars, cabooses, and more.

Future Plans 
Since 2012, the FWRHS has worked alongside the Norfolk Southern Railroad as a part of the 21st Century Steam Program. In this program, the 765, along with other historic steam locomotives in the Eastern United States, operate excursion trains for tourists and company employees & VIP's over the railroad's trackage. As well as being a part of the 21st Century Steam Program, the FWRHS is working with the city of Fort Wayne to develop a downtown riverfront property that will house the NKP 765 and the FWRHS as well as being a centerpiece for walking & biking trails and a park. The project, known as Headwaters Junction, is still in the planning phase, but if approved could boost the popularity and recognition of the FWRHS by making it a prominent attraction in the city.

External links 
 http://fortwaynerailroad.org/
 http://nkphts.org/

References 

Rail transportation preservation in the United States
1972 establishments in Indiana